Chuvash State Youth Theater of Sespel Mishshi is a theater located in Cheboksary, Chuvash Republic, Russia.

History
The Chuvash state theater of the young spectator of Michael Sespel has been based in Cheboksary. The first performance «Young layer» ("Stamp") under L. Bochin's play has taken place on April, 3rd, 1933 — a date considered to be the theater's "birthday". Its founders are Edvin Davydovich Fejertag and Margarita Nikolaevna Figner — the Leningrad directors, teachers and tutors of the future theatrical collective.

The special actor's set at the Chuvash is musical-theatrical technical school became a basis of theater for children and republic youth. Performances were played the Chuvash and Russian languages.

Theater today
Chuvash state awards of Friendship of the people the youth theater of M.Sespel carries out statements on products of the Chuvash, Russian and foreign playwrights in the Chuvash and Russian languages. Now in current repertoire of theater 23 performances, from them in 1 half-year 2007 are put — 4 performances: «Test of the magician» by V.Gin, "Native" by A.Zajtsev, «the Gold chicken» by V.Orlov, «the Kid and Carlson» by Astrid Lindgren.

Because the theater has possibility to work on a constant scene only 15 days in a month, the great attention is given to tour and exit activity. Following the results of first half-year 2007 by theater it is shown in areas of republic of 55 performances, 19 — outside of republic. In April, 2004 the theater has successfully spent small tours in Moscow within the limits of the international festival «Moscow — a world city», in August, 2004 — Istanbul — Open space — Theatre », passing in Istanbul (Turkey) with performance «77 wife of Don Zhuan with Cemeterial an avenue» by B.Chindykov, N.Kazakov has taken part in the International theatrical festival.

See also 
 Chuvash State Academic Drama Theatre
 Chuvash State Opera and Ballet Theater
 Chuvash State Puppet Theater
 Chuvash State Symphony Capella

Literature 
 Вдовцева Людмила Пахомовна, "Понимать своего зрителя": очерк о главном режиссере А.Г. Васильеве/ Лауреаты премии комсомола Чувашии имени М. Сеспеля. — Cheboksary:Чуваш. книж. изд-во, 1979 — 192 С. с илл. — С109.- С.120 (russian)

External links
 On festival to Istanbul there has gone the Chuvash youth theater
 In Cheboksary youth theater put the tragedy of "King Lear" in Chuvash

Buildings and structures in Chuvashia
Cheboksary
Theatres in Chuvashia
Theatres in Russia